Mr. Pusskins is a 2006 Children's picture book by Sam Lloyd. It is about a pampered cat called Mr. Pusskins who craves adventure but, after experiencing such an escapade, realises how fortunate his life is.

Publication history
2006 Mr. Pusskins, England, Orchard Books 
2007 Mr. Pusskins: A Love Story, USA, Atheneum Books for Young Readers

Reception
Kirkus Reviews wrote ".. this shaggy story of “cattitude” is amusing and unadulterated fun.", and Publishers Weekly wrote "Although the writing can be overly literal, Lloyd's astutely cartooned pictures more than make up for what her prose lacks in punch."
Booktrust found it "Humorous, lively illustrations accompany the text in this unconventional love story, which is also a lesson in not taking people for granted."

Mr. Pusskins has also been reviewed by Booklist, School Library Journal, Horn Book Guides, BookPage, Reading Time, Catholic Library World, and School Librarian.

It won the 2006 Booktrust Early Years Award for Best Pre-School Book.

Sequels
Further stories involving Mr. Pusskins include:
2007, Mr. Pusskins and Little Whiskers England, Orchard Books 
2008, Mr. Pusskins: Best in Show England, Orchard Books 
2009, Mr. Pusskins Colours England, Orchard Books 
2009, Mr. Pusskins Opposites England, Orchard Books

References

External links

Library holdings of Mr. Pusskins
National Public Radio program: It's Easy to Appreciate 'Mr. Pusskins'

2006 children's books
British picture books
Children's fiction books
Books about cats
Fictional cats
Orchard Books books